Mahesh may refer to:
 A title of Shiva, a Hindu deity
 Mahesh (name), personal name
 Mahesh, Serampore, a place in West Bengal, India